Falsamblymora tidorensis is a species of beetle in the family Cerambycidae, and the only species in the genus Falsamblymora. It was described by Breuning in 1959.

References

Desmiphorini
Beetles described in 1959
Monotypic Cerambycidae genera